Marco Giovanni Pisano (born 13 August 1981) is an Italian retired professional footballer who played as a left-sided defender.

Career

Early career
Pisano started his career at S.S. Lazio youth team. He joined Brescia of Serie B in January 2000, exchanged with Mauro Coppini. He was on loan to Serie C1 clubs in 2000–01 & 2001–02 season. He made his Serie A debut for Brescia on 20 October 2002, against Bologna.

In summer 2004, he joined U.C. Sampdoria.

Palermo
In June 2006, Pisano was involved in a 5 men swap deal with Palermo: Palermo signed including Aimo Diana (€5M), and Pisano (€4M) in 4-year contracts; Sampdoria signed Massimo Bonanni (50% for €2M), left back Pietro Accardi (€2M) and Christian Terlizzi (50% for €1.5M) in return. Pisano replaced departed Fabio Grosso as left back.

Torino
In January 2008, Pisano along with Diana (tagged for €1.2 million), were transferred to Torino F.C., in a temporary deal and a definitive deal respectively. At the end of season Torino bought Pisano for €1.5 million in a 3-year deal.

During 2009–10 season, Ultras of Torino attacked the players during David Di Michele's birthday party. After the incident the players involved: Di Michele, Massimo Loviso, Riccardo Colombo, Aimo Diana, Pisano, Francesco Pratali, Paolo Zanetti were transferred to other clubs and only Rolando Bianchi, Matteo Rubin and Angelo Ogbonna were remained.

On 27 January 2010 Bari signed the left-back on loan from Torino, the midfielder Filippo Antonelli has gone the other way. However, Pisano managed to play only one single game with Bari during his time at the club. Despite only an appearance, Torino also paid Bari €120,000 as a premium.

Parma
On 2 August 2010, Pisano signed by Parma F.C. for free (at the same time Filipe Oliveira moved to Turin in a temporary deal for €600,000; Pisano's transfer also cost Parma a small fee), but Pisano made just 5 league appearances as his chances at left-back were restricted by Luca Antonelli in the first half of the season and Massimo Gobbi in the second.

Vicenza 
In July 2011, Parma F.C. signed Raffaele Schiavi for €750,000 and sold Pisano to Vicenza Calcio for €150,000 in a 3-year contract. In 2013 Vicenza was relegated to 2013–14 Lega Pro Prima Divisione. Pisano failed to play any game for the club despite still under contract.

Venezia
On 31 January 2014 Pisano was signed by Football Club Unione Venezia for free.

References

External links
Profile from U.S. Città di Palermo official website
 2007–08 Profile at La Gazzetta dello Sport official site 
 Profile at Italian Footballers' Association (AIC), data by football.it 

1981 births
Living people
Italian footballers
Italy under-21 international footballers
S.S. Lazio players
Brescia Calcio players
Ascoli Calcio 1898 F.C. players
Taranto F.C. 1927 players
U.C. Sampdoria players
Palermo F.C. players
Torino F.C. players
Parma Calcio 1913 players
L.R. Vicenza players
Venezia F.C. players
Association football fullbacks
Footballers from Rome
Serie A players
Serie B players
Serie C players